Muhammad Khattak may refer to:

Muhammad Aslam Khan Khattak (1908–2008), Pakistani politician and diplomat 
Muhammad Khattak, a Canadian gang member of the Dixon City Bloods gang shot and injured in a gang-related affair in Toronto. Had been involved in Toronto Mayor Rob Ford's smoking crack cocaine affair. See Timeline of Rob Ford video scandal.